Taktici is a Slovak music group, established in 1977. In 1979 they defected to the US and in 1982 they went their separate ways.

History 
Taktici started their musical career in Bratislava's famous V-klub in 1970s. They played original melodic songs with controversial Slovak lyrics. In just three years from 1977-1979 they produced songs that withstood the advance of time and generations. Whats amazing is that even though their songs were played on the radio they’ve never been released on records. What’s even more incredible is that some songs that haven’t been played anywhere became cult hits. In 1979 they  were invited to UK to take part in Gary Glitter show. When the communist government of Czechoslovakia cancelled their tour, three members Vlado Kolenič, Július Mikeš, and Štefan Peller decided to immigrate to USA. Everything associated with TAKTICI was banned. Songs were taken off the radio and anyone connected with the band was interrogated. After fall of the Berlin wall they were resurrected. Songs were back on the radio but the band never returned to Slovakia. 

In May of 2013 the original band members reunited in New York City for a reunion show. It was attended by more than 300 people, most of them Slovak-Americans

Discography 
 Studio albums
 1980: Taktici
 1991: 10 dkg tresky 
 1992: Blázni 
 2000: Taktici 2000 
 2002: Taktici 2002 
 2005: Taktici Tribute band 2005
 2005: SK HITY 2 
 2007: Taktici Tribute band 2007 (Imidž je nanič, keď ležíš na cintoríne)

 Compilations
 1997: Taktici (1977–1997)
 2004: Taktici Tribute band 2004 (The Best Of)
 2006: TOP FUN HITY 5, vol.5 

 Singles
 1978: "Predavačka langošov"
 1979: "Tanečník" 

 Other appearances
 1979: Smoliari 
 1995: Smoliari a iné 
 2005: SK hity 2

See also
 Slovak popular music

References 

General

Specific

External links 

Taktici
 at Official website
Taktici at SuperMusic.sk

Taktici on Discogs

Nový al-bum
Nový al-bum on Discogs

Musical groups established in 1977
Slovak musical groups